Anti-Crisis Girl is a compilation album by Ukrainian artist Svetlana Loboda. The album was released to promote her appearance at the Eurovision Song Contest 2009. Loboda participated on behalf of Ukraine with the song "Be My Valentine! (Anti-Crisis Girl)" which features on the album in both English and Russian (Парень, Ты НиЧё! Paren, Ti NiCHo)

Track listing

Release history

References

2009 compilation albums
Svetlana Loboda albums